Barbara Brankovska (born September 25, 1952) is a Canadian former professional tennis player.

Originally from Czechoslovakia, Brankovska played Federation Cup tennis for her adopted country in 1976 and 1977, featuring in five ties. Her career also included qualifying draw appearances at Wimbledon and a second round appearance at the 1976 Canadian Open.

See also
List of Canada Fed Cup team representatives

References

External links
 
 

1952 births
Living people
Canadian female tennis players
Czechoslovak emigrants to Canada